Daniel Nermark (born 30 July 1977, in Karlstad, Sweden) is a Swedish international motorcycle speedway rider.

Career summary
Nermark first rode in the UK in 2001 when he signed for the Wolverhampton Wolves. In his second season Wolves won the Elite League. In 2005 he dropped down to the Premier League with the Edinburgh Monarchs. He joined the King's Lynn Stars in 2006 and was part of their treble winning side. He was retained in 2007 and finished third in the Premier League averages behind Chris Holder and Magnus Zetterstrom, and was voted Premier League Rider of the Year by his fellow professionals. 

In December 2008, it was announced he had signed for the Workington Comets on a full transfer from the Wolverhampton Wolves. Despite being offered a team place, Nermark decided not to return to Workington in 2009.

References

1977 births
Living people
Swedish speedway riders
Edinburgh Monarchs riders
Workington Comets riders
Wolverhampton Wolves riders
King's Lynn Stars riders
Ipswich Witches riders
Sportspeople from Karlstad